Elvis Dalsires Contreras de los Santos (born July 20, 1979 in Tamayo) is a male volleyball player from the Dominican Republic, who won the silver medal with the men's national team at the 2006 Pan American Cup in Mexicali, Mexico. He currently plays as a wing-spiker for Kazma sporting club.

Career
He won the "Best Spiker" award at the 2001 NORCECA Championship, and "Best Scorer" at the 2005 version.

At the 2007 NORCECA Championship, he was awarded "Best Receiver", and his national team finished in 5th place.

He won the Dominican Republic "2007 Volleyball Player of the Year".

In mid-June 2012, the Poland club Zaksa Kędzierzyn-Koźle announced his joining for the 2012–13 season.

Contreras won the bronze medal in the 2012 Men's Pan-American Volleyball Cup playing with his national team and also win the Best Receiver and Best Server awards.

Contreras led Technocrats to the title of the 2013 Caribbean Volleyball League, also winning the Most Valuable Player, Best Scorer, Best Spiker and Best Server awards in the Trinidad and Tobago-based tournament. He then joined the Brazilian club Funvic Taubaté.

In August 2014 Contreras announced that he would retire from the national team after the 2014 Central American and Caribbean Games. At these games, the Dominican Republic won the gold medal for the first time and Contreras were awarded Most Valuable Player, Best Outside Spiker and Best Scorer.

Clubs
 Bameso (1997–2000)
 Los Prados (2000–2003)
 7 Islas Compaktuna (2002–2003)
 Armet Bassano del Grappa (2003–2004)
 VfB Friedrichshafen (2004–2006)
 Leones de Ponce (2006)
 Sada Betim (2006–2007)
 Tonno Callipo Vibo Valentia (2007–2010)
 Bahoruco (2010)
 San José de Las Matas (2010)
 Dinamo Krasnodar (2011-2012)
 Zaksa Kędzierzyn-Koźle (2012)
 Iskra Odintsovo (2013)
 Technocrats (2013)
 La Romana (2013)
 Funvic/Taubaté (2013-2014)
 Alhi Club (2014-2015)
 Kazma sporting club (2019 present)

Individuals
 2001 NORCECA Championship "Best Spiker"
 2005 NORCECA Championship "Best Scorer"
 2006 Pan-American Cup "Most Valuable Player"
 2006 Pan-American Cup "Best Scorer"
 2006 Dominican Republic Volleyball Player of the Year"
 2007 NORCECA Championship "Best Receiver"
 2008 Pan-American Cup "Best Scorer"
 2012 Pan-American Cup "Best Server"
 2012 Pan-American Cup "Best Receiver"
 2013 Caribbean League "Most Valuable Player"
 2014 Arabian Champion "Most Valuable Player"
 2014 Dominican Republic Volleyball Player of the Year" 2014 Central American and Caribbean Games "Most Valuable Player" 2014 Central American and Caribbean Games "Best Outside Spiker" 2014 Central American and Caribbean Games "Best Scorer"Clubs
 2005 German Cup -  Champion, with VfB Friedrichshafen
 2005 German Championship -  Champion, with VfB Friedrichshafen
 2006 German Championship -  Champion, with VfB Friedrichshafen
 2006 German Cup -  Champion, with VfB Friedrichshafen
 2008 Italian A2 Championship -  Champion, with Tonno Callipo Vibo Valentia
 2010 Dominican Republic Volleyball League -  Runner-Up, with Bahoruco
 2013 Caribbean League -  Champion, with Technocrats
 2014 Arabian Champion Cup -   Champion, with Alhi Club Bahrain
 2015 Bahrain Championship -   Champion, with Alhi Club Bahrain

References

External links
 FIVB Profile
 Italian League Profile
 CEV Profile
 Player profile at Volleybox.net''

1979 births
Living people
Dominican Republic men's volleyball players
ZAKSA Kędzierzyn-Koźle players
Central American and Caribbean Games gold medalists for the Dominican Republic
Competitors at the 2014 Central American and Caribbean Games
Central American and Caribbean Games medalists in volleyball